Tara High School is one of several high schools in the East Baton Rouge Parish Public Schools District in Baton Rouge, Louisiana. It is located in the Tara Neighborhood of Baton Rouge. Tara High School is located at 9002 Whitehall Avenue, Baton Rouge, LA 70806. The school opened during the 1970–71 school year.

Communities served
Tara serves portions of Baton Rouge, as well as all or portions of several census-designated places (CDP): all of Westminster, most of Inniswold, most of Oak Hills Place, half of Gardere, and a small section of Shenandoah.

Athletics
Tara High athletics competes in the LHSAA. 

Tara High School fields several individual and team sports including American football, track and field, basketball, volleyball, wrestling, baseball, softball, and soccer. The mascot is the Trojan and the colors are cardinal and gold, very similar to the University of Southern California.

Championships
Football Championships
(1) State Championship: 1974

References

External links
 Tara High School
 

Public high schools in Louisiana
Schools in Baton Rouge, Louisiana
Educational institutions established in 1970